The following lists events that happened during 1867 in South Africa.

Incumbents
 Governor of the Cape of Good Hope and High Commissioner for Southern Africa: Sir Philip Wodehouse.
 Lieutenant-governor of the Colony of Natal:
 Sir John Bisset (acting until 23 May).
 Robert William Keate (from 24 May).
 State President of the Orange Free State: Jan Brand.
 State President of the South African Republic: Marthinus Wessel Pretorius.

Events
May
 24 – Robert William Keate is appointed as Lieutenant-governor of the Colony of Natal.

Date unknown
 The South African diamond fields are discovered.

Births
 26 March – Sir Arnold Theiler, founder of the Onderstepoort Veterinary Research Institute. (d. 1936)
 2 October – James Stevenson-Hamilton, first warden of the Kruger National Park. (d. 1957)
 Date unknown – Florence Fuller, South African-born Australian artist. (d. 1946)

Deaths

Railways

Railway lines opened
 4 April – Natal – Durban to Umgeni, .

References

South Africa
Years in South Africa
History of South Africa